Kissology Volume Three: 1992–2000 is a DVD/Home Video released by Kiss and VH1 Classic Records. It was issued on December 18, 2007. Kissology Volume Three is the third installment of the Kiss archival video series. The set covers the band's 1990s career on three discs, with a special fourth disc included that contains the earliest known performance footage of Kiss, filmed on December 22, 1973. The set also features four separate bonus discs sold only within initial first pressings. It was certified eight times platinum by the RIAA.

Track listing

Disc 1

Disc 2

Disc 3

Disc 4

Bonus Disc 1 - General Release

Bonus Disc 2 - Best Buy Exclusive

Bonus Disc 3 - Wal-Mart Exclusive

Bonus Disc 4 - VH1 Pre-order Exclusive

Easter Eggs in All Versions

Certifications

Sources
Sharp, Ken (Goldmine) - New KISS DVDs boldly breach the band's vaults
http://www.goldminemag.com/Default.aspx?tabid=825&articleid=7615&articlemid=4972 
Gullic, Ken (via KISSonline) - KISSology 2 Award & Vol. 3 Sneak Peek! 
http://www.kissonline.com/news/index.php?mode=fullstory&id=4565 
Kulick, Bruce - 9-24-07 "Message" 
http://www.kulick.net/message/archive07.shtml

References

2007 live albums
2007 video albums
Kiss (band) video albums
Live video albums